Juan María Montalvo y Fiallos (13 April 1832 in Ambato – 17 January 1889 in Paris) was an Ecuadorian author and essayist.

Biography
His grandfather, José Santos Montalvo, born in Andalucía, migrated to América and after some years working as a cinchona bark gatherer across Panamá, Venezuela and Colombia, he arrived at Ecuador where he worked as a seller of fabrics. In Guano, Ecuador, he meets Jacinta Oviedo, whom he married and had many children, one of them was Marcos, father of Juan Montalvo, who worked also as a traveller fabrics seller.

In one of Marcos' business trips, he arrives at Quinchicoto, a small town near Ambato, where he meets María José Fiallos and with whom he marries in the church "La Matriz" in Ambato, January 1, 1811. 

Born in Ambato to José Marcos Montalvo and Josefa Fiallos, he studied philosophy and law in Quito before returning to his hometown in 1854. He held diplomatic posts in Italy and France from 1857 to 1859. A political liberal, Montalvo's beliefs were marked by anti-clericalism and a keen hatred for the two caudillos that ruled Ecuador during his life: Gabriel García Moreno and Ignacio de Veintemilla. After an issue of El Cosmopolita viciously attacked Moreno, Montalvo was exiled to Colombia for seven years. Moreno's assassination was attributed to Montalvo's writings. He was a dedicated champion of democracy and an enemy of the writer Juan León Mera.

In the late seventies Juan Montalvo was twice exiled to France, remaining there from 1879, as punishment for Las catilinarias (1880), the work that made him famous throughout intellectual circles in the United States, Europe and the rest of Latin America. Alongside full-length books, Montalvo was an accomplished essayist, and his Siete Tratados (1882) and Geometría Moral (published in 1902, after his death) were popular in Ecuador and were banned by Veintemilla.

He also wrote a sequel to Miguel de Cervantes's Don Quixote, called Capítulos que se le Olvidaron a Cervantes ("Chapters Cervantes Forgot"), published posthumously in 1895. He died of tuberculosis in Paris.  His mummified body now rests in a mausoleum in his birthplace of Ambato.

Family
Juan Montalvo's father was Marco Montalvo Oviedo of Guano, and his mother was María Josefa Fiallos y Villacreces of Ambato. Montalvo was the youngest of 7 siblings: Francisco, Francisco Javier, Mariano, Alegría, Rosa, Juana and Isabel. Montalvo married María Guzmán Suárez in Ambato on 17 October 1868 and had two children with her. In 1882 he met Augustine Contoux with whom he had one child.

Legacy
Montalvo's likeness appears on the Ecuadorian five-centavo coin.

Works

 Las catilinarias (1880)
 Capítulos que se le olvidaron a Cervantes (1868) - Montalvo's only novel
 Libro de las pasiones (published posthumously in 1935) contains the dramas La Leprosa, Jara, Granja, El Descomulgado and El Dictador 
 Siete Tratados (1882)
 Geometría Moral (published posthumously in 1902)
 Judas (1872)

Literary and political magazines founded by Montalvo
 La Razón (1848)
 El Veterano (1849)
 La Moral evangélica (1854)
 El Espectador (1855)
 El Cosmopolita (1865)
 El Regenerador (1872)

References

Pareja Diezcanseco, Alfredo (1989), Entry: "Juan Montalvo (1832-1889)"; In: Solé, Carlos A. (editor in chief) and María Isabel Abreu (associate editor), Latin American Writers - Volume 1; New York: Charles Scribner's Sons, 3 volumes.

External links
 

1832 births
1889 deaths
Ecuadorian diplomats
Ecuadorian male writers
People from Ambato, Ecuador
Tuberculosis deaths in France
19th-century deaths from tuberculosis
Male novelists
19th-century male writers